The canton of La Châtre is an administrative division of the Indre department, central France. Its borders were modified at the French canton reorganisation which came into effect in March 2015. Its seat is in La Châtre.

It consists of the following communes:
 
La Berthenoux
Bommiers
Briantes
Brives
Champillet
La Châtre
Condé
Feusines
Lacs
Lignerolles
Lourouer-Saint-Laurent
Meunet-Planches
Montlevicq
La Motte-Feuilly
Néret
Neuvy-Pailloux
Nohant-Vic
Pérassay
Pouligny-Notre-Dame
Pouligny-Saint-Martin
Pruniers
Saint-Août
Saint-Aubin
Saint-Chartier
Saint-Christophe-en-Boucherie
Sainte-Sévère-sur-Indre
Sazeray
Thevet-Saint-Julien
Thizay
Urciers
Verneuil-sur-Igneraie
Vicq-Exemplet
Vigoulant
Vijon

References

Cantons of Indre